R391 road may refer to:
 R391 road (Ireland)
 R391 road (South Africa)